Antaeotricha ribbei is a moth in the family Depressariidae. It was described by Philipp Christoph Zeller in 1877. It is found in Panama, Mexico and Bolivia.

References

Moths described in 1877
ribbei
Moths of Central America
Moths of South America